General Lamadrid is a town in Buenos Aires Province, Argentina. It is the administrative seat of General Lamadrid Partido.

The settlement was founded on February 14, 1890 by provincial law. Before that time it was a small trading center known as Centro La Gama, next to a railroad line (Ferrocarril Roca Sud) since 1883.

It has a summer resort named Balneario Eduardo Baraboglia made on the shores of the Arroyo Salado, 3 km away from the city.

External links
 
 Municipal website 
 Local News 

Populated places in Buenos Aires Province
Populated places established in 1890